Denel Dynamics, formerly Kentron, is a division of Denel SOC Ltd, a South African armaments development and manufacturing company wholly owned by the South African Government. It underwent a name change from Kentron to Denel Aerospace Systems during the early part of 2004 and later to Denel Dynamics. Denel Dynamics is located in Centurion, South Africa. Several sites are operating according to ISO 9000 and ISO 14000 certified.

Key products

Kentron developed the ARD-10 loitering drone for the South African Defence Force in the 1980s, however with the end of the South African Border Wars it did not enter service. Kentron sold the designs to Israel Aerospace Industries which used them to develop the IAI Harpy which was first tested in 1989. The designs were sold to Iran Aviation Industries Organization in 2004/5 and used by Shahed Aviation Industries to develop the Shahed 131 and Shahed 136 drones.

UN arms embargo violation

Four South Africans working for Kentron were arrested in March 1984 in Coventry and charged with violation of the UN arms embargo – which outlawed the export of arms and military equipment to apartheid South Africa.

The Coventry Four were granted bail against a deposit of £200,000 and a guarantee by a diplomat from the South African embassy who waived his diplomatic immunity. They were allowed to return to South Africa on condition that they appeared at their trial in England in August 1984. In the event, South African foreign minister, Pik Botha, refused to allow them to return for their trial.

See also
 Armscor (South Africa)
 Military of South Africa
 Military history of South Africa
 South African Air Force
 List of aircraft of the South African Air Force
 Advena (formerly Kentron Circle)

References

External links
 Denel Dynamics Official Site

Aircraft engineering companies
Defence companies of South Africa
Aerospace companies of South Africa
Guided missile manufacturers
Denel